Bluffer's Guide to the Flight Deck is the 2004 debut album released by Flotation Toy Warning.

Track listing
 "Happy 13" – 4:51
 "Popstar Researching Oblivion" – 6:13
 "Losing Carolina: For Drusky" – 7:56
 "Made From Tiny Boxes" – 1:29
 "Donald Pleasance" – 9:27
 "Fire Engine on Fire, Pt. 1" – 6:51
 "Fire Engine on Fire, Pt. 2" – 6:55
 "Even Fantastica" – 7:28
 "Happiness Is on the Outside" – 3:28
 "How the Plains Left Me Flat" – 15:39

Personnel
 Paul Carter - Lead Vocals, Samples, Programming
 Ben Clay - Guitar, Bass
 Colin Coxall - Drums, Octopad
 Nainesh Shah - Guitar, Bass, Vocals
 Vicky West - Keyboards, Samples, Vocals
Recorded by Steve Swindon at The Old Clothes Factory.
Mixed by Brian O'Shaughnessy and Flotation Toy Warning at Bark Studio.
Mastered by Nick Robbins at Soundmastering.
Produced by Steve Swindon and Flotation Toy Warning.
All songs written by Paul Carter and Ben Clay with Flotation Toy Warning.
Lyrics by Paul Carter. Brass and string arrangements by Vicky West.
Sleeve design by Vicky West.
 Dominic Glover - Trumpet, Flugel
 Mat Colman - Trombone
 Gwen Cheeseman - Violin
 Anne Marie Kirby - Violin
 John Greswell - Viola
 Sarah Kaldor - Cello
 Rhys Llewellyn - Drums

References

2004 debut albums
Flotation Toy Warning albums